The 1978–79 Divizia A was the sixty-first season of Divizia A, the top-level football league of Romania.

Teams

League table

Results

Top goalscorers

Champion squad

See also 
 1978–79 Divizia B
 1978–79 Divizia C
 1978–79 County Championship

References

Liga I seasons
Romania
1978–79 in Romanian football